Beside the Ocean of Time (1994) is a novel by Scottish writer George Mackay Brown. It was shortlisted for the Booker Prize and judged Scottish Book of the Year by the Saltire Society.  The plot follows Thorfinn Ragnarson from Norday in the Orkney Islands of the 1930s. The son of a tenant farmer, he regularly daydreams about historical fantasies. After foreseeing his own future, he begins to see a correlation between history, daydreaming and fate.

References

1994 British novels
Novels by George Mackay Brown
Novels set in Orkney
Fiction set in the 1930s
John Murray (publishing house) books